The Arsenal F.C.–Chelsea F.C. rivalry is a rivalry between London-based professional association football clubs Arsenal Football Club and Chelsea Football Club. Arsenal play their home games at the Emirates Stadium, while Chelsea play their home games at Stamford Bridge.

Overall, Arsenal have won more games in the rivalry's history, having won 81 times to Chelsea's 66, with 59 draws (as of 6 November 2022). Arsenal's record win was a 5–1 victory in a First Division match at Stamford Bridge on 29 November 1930. Chelsea's record win was a 6–0 victory at Stamford Bridge in the Premier League on 22 March 2014. Didier Drogba holds the mark for the most derby goals with 13 in all competitions.

The clubs have contested five major finals: the 2002 FA Cup final, which Arsenal won 2–0, the 2007 League Cup final, which Chelsea won 2–1, the 2017 FA Cup final, which Arsenal won 2–1, the 2019 Europa League final, which Chelsea won 4–1, and the 2020 FA Cup final, which Arsenal won 2–1.

Background
While they never considered each other primary rivals, as two of the biggest and most successful clubs in London there has always been strong needle between the fans dating back to the 1930s. Matches between them would often attract large attendances.

The Arsenal and Chelsea rivalry has been more recently considered an important derby, after Chelsea's rise to the top class of the Premier League in the 2000s, when the two started to compete constantly for the Premier League title.

According to an internet survey of fans in December 2003, the Arsenal fans who responded to the survey said that they considered Chelsea as their third rival, after Manchester United and Tottenham Hotspur.

Those Chelsea fans who responded to the survey said that they considered Arsenal as their main rival, however Tottenham and Fulham are their more traditional rivals.

In a 2008 survey by the Football Fans Census, Arsenal fans named Chelsea as the club they disliked the most, ahead of their traditional rivals Tottenham. Chelsea fans named Arsenal as their second most-disliked club, behind Liverpool. A 2014 Bleacher Report article ranks Arsenal as Chelsea's second-most hated rival.

History
The first league meeting between the two teams took place on 9 November 1907 at Stamford Bridge. This was the first Football League First Division game played between two London clubs and drew a crowd of 65,000. A match between the clubs at Stamford Bridge in 1935 drew a crowd of 82,905, the second highest recorded attendance for an English league match. They met in two close contested FA Cup semi-finals in the 1950s, with Arsenal winning both times. In the 1960s Chelsea dominated the tie with 14 wins, two draws and just two losses during the decade.

The two teams have met in the quarter-finals of the 2003–04 UEFA Champions League, with Chelsea winning 3–2 on aggregate to go through to the semi-finals.

In 2006, the transfer of Ashley Cole from Arsenal to Chelsea further stoked the rivalry, as Cole had been caught meeting Chelsea officials months before.

The 2007 Football League Cup final was one of the most noted incidents. The game was marred by a fracas involving Frank Lampard, Cesc Fàbregas and others that resulted in yellow cards for the two and three other players sent off, the dismissal of Emmanuel Adebayor and incidents of Chelsea fans throwing celery at Arsenal players. This led the media to dub it the "Snarling Cup final". The match ended in a 2–1 victory for Chelsea.

On 27 December 2010, Chelsea came into the Emirates having beaten Arsenal five times in a row by a goal difference of 13–2, only for Arsenal to win the match 3–1.

On 29 October 2011, Arsenal won 5–3 at Stamford Bridge after coming from behind twice, with Robin van Persie scoring two late goals and completing his hat-trick. It is widely regarded as one of the most memorable and best games between the two sides.

On 22 March 2014, in Arsène Wenger's 1,000th game in charge, Chelsea won 6–0. This marked the most goals Chelsea had scored against Arsenal, Chelsea's biggest margin of victory against Arsenal and the joint heaviest margin of defeat suffered by Wenger at Arsenal. Notable incidents in the match included Chelsea jumping out to a three-goal lead inside of 15 minutes, as well as the sending off of Kieran Gibbs by referee Andre Marriner for a handball committed by his teammate Alex Oxlade-Chamberlain.

On 5 October 2014, Chelsea beat Arsenal 2–0, which meant Arsenal manager Wenger had not won against José Mourinho in twelve attempts. This game also featured former Arsenal captain Cesc Fàbregas playing against his former club for Chelsea for the first time, recording an assist on Diego Costa's goal. The match, however, is most notable for a touchline fracas that occurred between the managers in the technical area during the fierce match. On 2 August 2015, Wenger finally recorded a win against Mourinho, defeating Chelsea 1–0 in the 2015 FA Community Shield.

On 24 September 2016, Arsenal beat Chelsea 3–0 at the Emirates Stadium. It was the first time Arsenal scored against Chelsea since 2013, and Arsenal's first win over The Blues since 2011 in the Premier League. All three goals were scored in the first half by Alexis Sánchez, Theo Walcott and Mesut Özil. It was Arsenal's biggest win over Chelsea since 1997.

The two teams have met in the 2017 FA Cup final, where Arsenal won their record 13th FA Cup trophy by defeating Chelsea 2–1. Arsenal repeated the feat in the 2017 FA Community Shield, winning 4–1 on penalties after the match ended 1–1. It was also the first time the "ABBA" penalty taking system has been used by The Football Association. On 29 May 2019, the two teams met in their first-ever European final, doing so in the Europa League, where Chelsea defeated Arsenal 4–1 to clinch their second title in the competition. The game was also the final career match of Petr Čech, who played for both teams between 2004 and 2019. The next season, Arsenal and Chelsea contested in another FA Cup final, which ended in a 2–1 victory for Arsenal with two goals by Pierre-Emerick Aubameyang, securing their 14th title.

In the 2020–21 Premier League, Arsenal completed their first Premier League "double" over Chelsea since 2003–04 after winning both games of the season.

Players who have played for or managed both teams
Below are the players and managers who played for or managed both clubs.

Arsenal then Chelsea

 Sandy MacFarlane 
 Jimmy Sharp 
 Leslie Knighton 
 Bob Turnbull 
 Ted Drake 
 Tommy Docherty 
 Allan Young 
 Tommy Baldwin 
 Graham Rix 
 Clive Allen 
 Peter Nicholas 
 David Rocastle 
 Emmanuel Petit 
 Nicolas Anelka 
 Ashley Cole 
 Cesc Fàbregas 
 Olivier Giroud 
 Pierre-Emerick Aubameyang

Chelsea then Arsenal

 Tommy Lawton 
 Bill Dickson 
 John Hollins 
 George Graham 
 Stewart Houston 
 Alan Hudson 
 Colin Pates 
 William Gallas 
 Lassana Diarra 
 Yossi Benayoun 
 Petr Čech 
 David Luiz 
 Willian 
 Jorginho

Honours

Head-to-head record

As of match played 6 November 2022

Results

Premier League (1992–present)  

Summary

Highest attendances
 Arsenal 2–1 Chelsea: 89,472 (27 May 2017), Wembley (neutral)
 Arsenal 1–2 Chelsea: 88,103 (18 April 2009), Wembley (neutral)
 Arsenal 1–0 Chelsea: 85,437 (2 August 2015), Wembley (neutral)
 Arsenal 1–1 Chelsea: 83,325 (6 August 2017), Wembley (neutral)
 Chelsea 1–1 Arsenal: 82,905 (12 October 1935), Stamford Bridge (Chelsea home)
 Arsenal 2–0 Chelsea: 73,963 (4 May 2002), Millennium Stadium (neutral)
 Arsenal 1–2 Chelsea: 70,073 (25 February 2007), Millennium Stadium (neutral)
 Arsenal 1–1 Chelsea: 68,084 (5 April 1952), White Hart Lane (Tottenham Hotspur home)
 Chelsea 2–1 Woolwich Arsenal: 65,000 (9 November 1907), Stamford Bridge (Chelsea home)
 Arsenal 2–1 Chelsea: 62,746 (20 March 1973), Highbury (Arsenal home)

See also

Arsenal F.C.–Manchester United F.C. rivalry
Chelsea F.C.–Leeds United F.C. rivalry
Chelsea F.C.–Tottenham Hotspur F.C. rivalry
North London derby
West London derby

References

External links
Soccerbase

Chelsea rivalry
Chelsea F.C.
England football derbies
London derbies